Smolka is a Slavic surname that may refer to

Josef Smolka (born 1939), Czech volleyball player
Louis Smolka (born 1991), American mixed martial artist 
Lyubov Smolka (born 1952), Soviet Olympic runner
Martin Smolka (born 1959), Czech classical composer
Peter Smolka or Smollett (born 1912), Austrian/British journalist and Soviet spy
Stanisław Smolka (1854–1924), Polish historian